The year 2013 was the 232nd year of the Rattanakosin Kingdom of Thailand. It was the 68th year in the reign of King Bhumibol Adulyadej (Rama IX), and is reckoned as year 2556 in the Buddhist Era. The year saw the beginning of protests against Prime Minister Yingluck Shinawatra's government which led to a state of political crisis and the dissolution of government.

Incumbents
King: Bhumibol Adulyadej 
Crown Prince: Vajiralongkorn
Prime Minister: Yingluck Shinawatra
Supreme Patriarch:
until 24 October: Nyanasamvara Suvaddhana

Events

January
 January 23 - A court in Thailand sentences a magazine editor to ten years' imprisonment for publishing articles that were deemed to have insulted the monarchy.

February
 February 10 - A roadside bombing in Yala Province kills 5 soldiers and injures three others.
 February 13–16 Muslim insurgents are killed during an attack on a military base in Narathiwat.
 February 25 - At least 4 people are dead and 20 injured after a homemade bomb is detonated at a Buddhist festival in Maha Sarakham Province.
 February 28 - Thailand agrees to peace talks with Muslim rebels for the first time after 20 years of conflict.

March
 March 2 - Suspected insurgents detonate a motorcycle bomb in Southern Thailand killing 2 Thai Military rangers and wounding 11 people.
 March 3 - 2013 Bangkok gubernatorial election took place. Sukhumbhand Paribatra, a Democrat, won the election. He compiled 47.75% of the national vote.
 March 3 - Thailand promises to put an end to legal ivory trade within the country.
 March 22 - 2013 Thailand refugee camp fire took place. There were 37 reported deaths.

April

May

June
 June 29 - Eight soldiers killed by roadside bomb in south Thailand.

July
 July 27 - Rayong oil spill occurred in the Gulf of Thailand.

August

September
Tropical Depression 18W (2013) took place in mid September.

October

November
 November 7 - Intergovernmental Agreement on Dry Ports was a United Nations treaty that became opened for signature.

December
 December 22 - 22 December 2013 South Thailand bombings

Births

Deaths

Sport

September
 September 21–29 - 2013 PTT Thailand Open took place. Milos Raonic was the champion of 2013 PTT Thailand Open – Singles. Jamie Murray and John Peers were the champions for the 2013 PTT Thailand Open – Doubles.

See also
 2013 Thai Premier League
 2013 Thai Division 1 League
 2013 in Thai television
 List of Thai films of 2013

References

External links
Year 2013 Calendar - Thailand

 
Years of the 21st century in Thailand
Thailand
2010s in Thailand
Thailand